Berndorf is a town in the district of Baden in Lower Austria in Austria. Because of its historic development in the 19th century it is also referred to as the Krupp town.

Districts
The town consists of 4 districts:
 Berndorf-Stadt
 St. Veit
 Ödlitz
 Veitsau / Steinhof

Settlements
 Kolonie

History
Artefacts from various epoques of the Stone Age prove that there was a settlement in this region.

Perindorf is likely to have its name from a man named Pero, who settled here in 1070. The name Perendorf was first mentioned in 1133.

Throughout the following centuries, Berndorf was ravaged by the Magyars and the Ottomans.

In the 18th century, metal-working companies such as Neuhirtenberger Kupferhammer, which used the first steam engine in all of Lower Austria in 1836, settled in this region. Before that, hydropower coming from the Triesting was the main energy source.

In the 19th century the majority of the inhabitants of Berndorf and its neighbouring villages worked in the metal industry. In 1844, Berndorf consisted of no more than 50 houses with about 180 inhabitants, when the cutlery factory of Alexander Schoeller and Hermann Krupp was founded. Initially, there were 50 workers, but throughout the years, the company developed and turned into a multi-national combine with over 6,000 employees. The development of the city of Berndorf was closely related to the history of the Krupp family.
Arthur Krupp, son of Hermann Krupp, founded a private elementary school and a public swimming pool, as well as the neo-baroque St. Margaret's church.

In 1923, the communities of Berndorf, St. Veit, Ödlitz and Veitsau were united and formed the city of Berndorf.

After the Anschluss in 1938, the Arthur Krupp company became a part of the German Krupp combine.
Because of its industrial importance, Berndorf was also an important target of air attacks. During World War II, Berndorf was not even spared the forces of nature. The floods in 1939 and 1944 were the most destructive floods in the history of the Triesting river.

When the war had ended, the metal company was confiscated by the Soviet Army and incorporated into the USIA. In 1957, it was given back to the State of Austria and merged with the Vereinigte Aluminiumwerke Ranshofen (VAW).

Because of financial problems of the socialised industries in the 1980s, the Berndorf consortium was spun off and passed into private hands.

Population

Culture

Theatre
The annual theatre festival takes place in the municipal theatre of Berndorf every summer.

Sights
 Municipal Theatre of Berndorf
 Krupp schools
 Guglzipf with its look-out
 Krupp Stadt Museum
 The iron bear
 St. Margaret's Church
 St. Mary's Church

Twin cities
 Ōhasama (Japan, now a part of Hanamaki)
 Sigmundsherberg

References

Further reading
 Dietmar Lautscham: Arthur, der österreichische Krupp.

External links

 the city of Berndorf, only in German
 Krupp Stadt Museum, only in German

Cities and towns in Baden District, Austria
Krupp